Makala is a municipality (commune) in the Funa district of Kinshasa, the capital city of the Democratic Republic of the Congo.

Demographics

References

Communes of Kinshasa
Funa District